Ghosts of Darkness (also known as House of Ghosts) is a 2017 British comedy horror film directed by David Ryan Keith, starring Michael Koltes, Paul Flannery and Steve Weston.

Cast
 Michael Koltes as Jack Donovan
 Paul Flannery as Jonathan Blazer
 Steve Weston as Mysterious Man

Release
The film was released to VOD on 7 March 2017.

Reception
Phil Wheat of Nerdly rated the film 5 stars out of 5, calling it "a perfect storm of filmmaking: everyone and everything coming together to create something sensational." Blacktooth of Horror Society gave the film a rating of 4 out of 5, writing that it has "an amazing cast and one hell of a story". James Evans of Starburst rated the film 7 stars out of 10, calling it "hugely likeable, frequently funny, and importantly a good time".

Ian Sedensky of Culture Crypt gave the film a score of 55 out of 100. Matt Boiselle of Dread Central rated the film 2.5 stars out of 5, writing that "this particular go-round has seen its tires’ treads ground down to a bald surface – “been there, done that” once again."

References

External links
 
 

British comedy horror films
2017 comedy horror films
2017 films
2010s British films